Esther Akoth Kokeyo (born 8 April 1983), better known as Akothee, is a Kenyan musician and businesswoman. She is the founder of Akothee Safaris, a tour company based in Kenya, the Akothee Foundation, a charity, and Aknotela and Akothee Homes, a real estate business.

Early life and education

Akoth was born in 1983 in Kisumu County, the daughter of an administrator father and a politician mother, and grew up in Migori County. She attended Nyabisawa Girls Secondary School, but dropped out at 14 to elope with her husband.

Music career

Akoth's music career started in 2008. Since then, she has released solo tracks as well as collaborations with other artists including Diamond Platnumz. Her released tracks include "Oyoyo" featuring MC Galaxy, "Give It To Me" featuring Flavour, "Sweet Love" featuring Diamond Platnumz, "Benefactor", "Yuko Moyoni", "New Dance" featuring Oc, "Osilliation", "Nimechoka", "Pashe", "Katika", "Djele Djele", "Shengerera", "Mama Bougerie", and "Tucheze". In March 2020, Akoth released "Mwitu asa", a song written and sang in the Kamba language.

Awards
She has won several awards, including "Best Female Artist (East Africa)" at the African Muzik Magazine Awards in 2016 and 2019, "Best Video" at the African Muzik Magazine Awards in 2016, and "Best Female Artist" at the African Entertainment Awards USA.

Akoth has over one million followers on Instagram, and is currently the 11th most followed East African celebrity.

Business career 
Akoth founded Akothee Safaris, a tour and travel company based in Nairobi, Kenya, and appointed her daughter as director of the company. She also founded a charity called the Akothee Foundation, and manages a real-estate company, Aknotela and Akothee Homes.

Personal life 
Akoth has five children, three daughters and two boys. She owns houses in Mombasa, Migori County, and Zurich.

References

Living people
1983 births
20th-century Kenyan women singers